Gentiana asclepiadea, the willow gentian, is a species of flowering plant of the genus Gentiana in the family Gentianaceae, native to central and eastern Europe from primarily mountain (montane) woodland though it does occur in less wooded open pasture in some areas, perhaps persisting after woodland clearance.

Trumpet-shaped, deep blue flowers occur in late summer into autumn.

Like many members of the genus and indeed the family Gentianaceae, the roots have a close association with certain fungi in a similar way to the Orchidaceae and Ericaceae though of course completely unrelated to both of these families. This particular species is relatively easy to grow in most garden situations as long as it has plenty of organic material added to the soil.

Gentiana asclepiadea likes moist, rich, well-drained soil in full sun or partial shade. The plant can be divided after flowering, however it seldom needs this. Propagate by seed sown as soon as the seed is ripe into a cold frame. If sowing the seed indoors then cold treatment is needed.

This plant is susceptible to spider mites, slugs, snails and aphids.

Gentiana asclepiadea has gained the Royal Horticultural Society's Award of Garden Merit.

References

External links
 
 

asclepiadea
Flora of Eastern Europe
Plants described in 1753
Taxa named by Carl Linnaeus